Military frontier is a generic geographical term for:

 any buffer zone or
 cordon sanitaire (disambiguation) (in the broad sense of the term)
 an area subject to military occupation as a precursor to annexation
 Military Frontier, a specific region along the southern borders of the Austro-Hungarian Empire

See also
 Neutral zone (disambiguation)
 Demilitarized zone